Exostoma tenuicaudata is a species of sisorid catfish from the Siang River, in the Brahmaputra River basin in Arunachal Pradesh, India.

References

Catfish of Asia
Fish of India
Taxa named by Lakpa Tamang
Taxa named by Bikramjit Sinha
Taxa named by Shantabala Devi Gurumayum
Fish described in 2015
Sisoridae